Edward Burgess may refer to:

 Edward Burgess (yacht designer) (1848–1891), American yacht designer
 Edward Burgess (British Army officer) (1927–2015), British Army general
 Edward M. Burgess (born 1934), American chemist
 Edward Sandford Burgess (1855–1928), American botanist
 Edward Burgess (architect) (c. 1850–1929), British architect
 Edward Burgess (merchant) (1810–1855), English merchant and British subject in Qajar Iran